is the fourth studio album by the Japanese girl group Momoiro Clover Z,  released in Japan on February 17, 2016.

It was released on the same day with the group's third album, Amaranthus. According to Oricon, Hakkin no Yoake sold 81,254 units in its first week and Amaranthus sold 80,783. Hakkin no Yoake debuted at number 1 in the Oricon weekly albums chart and Amaranthus at number 2.

Track listing

Charts

References

External links 
 Special site for the 2016 Momoiro Clover Z albums (official)
 Interview with Momoiro Clover Z on Natalie
 Interview with the album's producer on the Billboard Japan website

Momoiro Clover Z albums
2016 albums
King Records (Japan) albums